Just Good Friends is a 1980s British sitcom which starred Paul Nicholas and Jan Francis 

Just Good Friends may also refer to:

 "Just Good Friends" (song), a song by Michael Jackson, featuring Stevie Wonder, from Bad
 "Just Good Friends", a song by Rick Astley, the B-side of the single "Whenever You Need Somebody"
 "Just Good Friends (Close)", a song by Fish from Internal Exile
 "Just Good Friends", an episode of Miss Jones and Son